This page lists the 'highest natural elevation of each sovereign state on the continent of Oceania defined physiographically. States sometimes associated with Oceania politically and culturally, but not geographically part of Oceania, are not included in this list of physical features.

Not all points in this list are mountains or hills, some are simply elevations that are not distinguishable as geographical features.

Notes

See also
List of elevation extremes by country
Geography of Oceania
Lists of mountains by region#Oceania – a list of Oceania mountain lists
Extreme points of Oceania
List of highest points of African countries
List of highest points of Asian countries
List of highest points of European countries

References
CIA World Factbook

Geography of Oceania
Oceania